The Uganda National Rescue Front (UNRF), refers to two former armed rebel groups in Uganda's West Nile sub-region that first opposed, then became incorporated into the Ugandan armed forces.

UNRF
The first Uganda National Rescue Front, also known as "National Salvation Front", was formed to oppose Milton Obote during his second term (1980–1985) as president of Uganda. The UNRF was composed of former supporters of Idi Amin, and headed by Brigadier Moses Ali, formerly Amin's Minister of Finance.

After the fall of Obote in July 1984/5, over 1000 of the UNRF joined Yoweri Museveni's government. Luwero Moses Ali held a large number and variety of positions in Museveni's government, including Minister of Tourism and Wildlife , and Minister of Youth, Culture and Sport. In April 1990 he was arrested on treason charges, and incarcerated until June 1992, when he was released and acquitted.  This did not prevent his later being appointed Minister of Internal Affairs, Minister for Disaster Preparedness, and Deputy Prime Minister.

UNRF II

The Uganda National Rescue Front II was a group that broke from the West Nile Bank Front in 1996, and included members of the original UNRF that did not make peace with Museveni. It operated mostly in Aringa County, Arua District, out of bases in southern Sudan, and received support from the Sudanese government (the National Islamic Front), in retaliation for Ugandan government support for the Sudan People's Liberation Army. It was led by Major General Ali Bamuze.

On December 24, 2002, the UNRF II signed a formal ceasefire with the government in the town of Yumbe in northwestern Uganda. Terms included a battalion of UNRF II soldiers being incorporated in the Ugandan army, and USh 4.2 billion being distributed to the group. Moses Ali is reported to have participated in the negotiations.

References

 Uganda signs peace deal with rebels 26 December 2002, BBC News.
 Uganda January - December 2002 report from Amnesty International.
  Gen. Moses Ali: A dream come true By Richard M. Kavuma March 23, 2003 Uganda Daily Monitor article
 Rebels divided over Shs 4 bn December 10, 2003 article from the Uganda Daily Monitor
 Inside West Nile, 2004 book by Mark Leopold.

Works cited 
 

Rebel groups in Uganda
Government of Uganda